Herøy is a municipality in Nordland county, Norway. It is part of the Helgeland traditional region. The administrative centre of the municipality is the village of Silvalen.

The  municipality is the 343rd largest by area out of the 356 municipalities in Norway. Herøy is the 290th most populous municipality in Norway with a population of 1,825.

General information

The municipality of Herøy was established in 1864 when it was separated from Alstahaug Municipality. Initially the population of Herøy was 2,438. On 1 July 1917, the northern district of Herøy (population: 1,530) was separated from Herøy to become the new municipality of Nordvik. This left Herøy with 2,555 residents.

During the 1960s, there were many municipal mergers across Norway due to the work of the Schei Committee. On 1 January 1962 the part of Herøy on the island of Dønna (population: 19) was transferred to the new municipality of Dønna. On 1 January 1965 the Husvær/Sandværet island groups (population: 461) were transferred from Alstahaug to Herøy.

Name
The municipality is named after the islands of Søndre Herøya and Nordre Herøya. The first element is herr which means "army" (here in the sense of skipaherr which means "military fleet") and the last element is the definite form of øy which means "island". The sound between the islands was probably a meeting place for the Leidang fleet of the district. Historically, the name was spelled Herø.

Coat of arms
The coat of arms was granted on 3 July 1987. The official blazon is "Azure, three oars Or issuant from the base, the central one abased". This means the arms have a blue field (background) and the charge is three vertical oars arranged in a horizontal row, with the middle oar, slightly lower. The oars have a tincture of Or which means it is commonly colored yellow, but if it is made out of metal, then gold is used. The blue color in the field symbolizes the importance of the ocean for the island municipality. The oar was chosen to represent the importance of boats. The municipal name comes from the Old Norse word "herr" which means a military meeting place, i.e. the place where fleet gathers. Thus the arms are canting. The arms were designed by Jarle E. Henriksen.

Churches
The Church of Norway has one parish within the municipality of Herøy. It is part of the Nord-Helgeland prosti (deanery) in the Diocese of Sør-Hålogaland.

Geography

The municipality of Herøy consists of about 1,700 little islands and islets. The main islands are Nord-Herøy, Sør-Herøy, Tenna, Ytre Øksningan, Indre Øksningan, Seløya, and Staulen— all of which are connected by bridges including Åkviksundet Bridge, Hoholmen Bridge, Kalvøyrevet Bridge. Most islands are low and close to the sea surface.

There are also several smaller outlying island groups such as Gåsvær, Husvær, and Sandværet. Ytterholmen Lighthouse is located in the far western part of the municipality.

Government
All municipalities in Norway, including Herøy, are responsible for primary education (through 10th grade), outpatient health services, senior citizen services, unemployment and other social services, zoning, economic development, and municipal roads. The municipality is governed by a municipal council of elected representatives, which in turn elect a mayor.  The municipality falls under the Alstahaug District Court and the Hålogaland Court of Appeal.

Municipal council
The municipal council of Herøy is made up of 19 representatives that are elected to four year terms. The party breakdown of the council is as follows:

Mayor
The mayors of Herøy (incomplete list):
2019–present: Elbjørg Larsen (Ap)
2003-2019: Arnt Frode Jensen (Ap)

Economy
The main industries in the municipality is fishing, fish farming and processing activities associated with this. Other important industries are agriculture, transportation, service industries, and tourism.

Notable people 
 Benjamin Dass (1706 at Skar farm in Alstahaug, Herøy – 1775) an educator and scholar, Rector of Trondheim Cathedral School

References

External links
Municipal fact sheet from Statistics Norway 

 
Municipalities of Nordland
1864 establishments in Norway